The typical spinetails, Cranioleuca, are a genus of Neotropical birds in the ovenbird family Furnariidae.

This is a homogeneous group of small birds that live in forested habitats. The spinetails in this genus differ from those placed in Synallaxis in having shorter tails and being more arboreal. They are less vocal and more frequently join mixed flocks.

Taxonomy and species list
The genus Cranioleuca was introduced in 1853 by the German naturalist Ludwig Reichenbach with the light-crowned spinetail as the type species. The name combines the Ancient Greek kranion meaning "skull" with leukos meaning "white".

The genus contains 19 species:
 Creamy-crested spinetail, Cranioleuca albicapilla
 Light-crowned spinetail, Cranioleuca albiceps
 Marcapata spinetail, Cranioleuca marcapatae
 Line-cheeked spinetail, Cranioleuca antisiensis
 Ash-browed spinetail, Cranioleuca curtata
 Streak-capped spinetail, Cranioleuca hellmayri
 Tepui spinetail, Cranioleuca demissa
 Pallid spinetail, Cranioleuca pallida
 Red-faced spinetail, Cranioleuca erythrops
 Grey-headed spinetail, Cranioleuca semicinerea
 Crested spinetail, Cranioleuca subcristata
 Olive spinetail, Cranioleuca obsoleta
 Stripe-crowned spinetail, Cranioleuca pyrrhophia
 Rusty-backed spinetail, Cranioleuca vulpina
 Coiba spinetail, Cranioleuca dissita
 Parker's spinetail or white-breasted spinetail, Cranioleuca vulpecula
 Speckled spinetail, Cranioleuca gutturata
 Scaled spinetail, Cranioleuca muelleri
 Bolivian spinetail, Cranioleuca henricae

References

 
Bird genera
Taxa named by Ludwig Reichenbach
Taxonomy articles created by Polbot